Greco-Roman mythology features male homosexuality in many of the constituent myths.  In addition, there are instances of cross-dressing, and of androgyny which has been grouped under the acronym LGBTQ+.

Overall
These myths have been described as being crucially influential on Western LGBT literature, with the original myths being constantly re-published and re-written, and the relationships and characters serving as icons. In comparison, lesbian relationships are rarely found in classical myths.

Sexuality

Homosexuality and bisexuality
Apollo, the god of sun and music, is considered the patron of same sex love, as he had many male lovers and was often invoked to bless homosexual unions. He is also called "the champion of male love" by Andrew Callimach. Other gods are sometimes considered patrons of homosexual love between males, such as the love goddess Aphrodite and gods in her retinue, such as the Erotes: Eros, Himeros and Pothos. Eros is also part of a trinity of gods that played roles in homoerotic relationships, along with Heracles and Hermes, who bestowed qualities of beauty (and loyalty), strength, and eloquence, respectively, onto male lovers. In the poetry of Sappho, Aphrodite is identified as the patron of lesbians.

Achilles and Patroclus
Achilles and Troilus
Agamemnon and Argynnus
Ameinias and Narcissus
Apollo and Admetus
Apollo and Adonis
Apollo and Branchus
Apollo and Carnus
Apollo and Cyparissus
Apollo and Helenus
Apollo and Hyacinth
Apollo and Hymenaios
Apollo and Iapis
Ares and Alectryon
Asclepius and Hippolytus
Athena and Myrmex
Athis and Lycabas
Boreas and Hyacinth
Chiron and Dionysus
Cycnus and Phaethon
Cycnus and Phylius
Cydon and Clytius
Dionysus and Ampelus
Dionysus and Prosymnus
Eurybarus and Alcyoneus
Hephaestus and Peleus
Heracles and Abderus
Heracles and Eurystheus
Heracles and Hylas
Heracles and Iolaus
Hermes and Amphion
Hermes and Crocus
Hermes and Perseus
Hermes and Pollux
Hesperus and Hymenaeus
Hymenaeus and Argynnus
Hypnos and Endymion
Ianthe and Iphis
Kalamos and Karpos
Laius and Chrysippus
Marsyas and Olympus
Minos and Ganymede
Minos and Miletus
Minos and Theseus
Nisus and Euryalus
Orestes and Pylades
Orpheus and the Thracians
Orpheus and Kalais
Pan and Daphnis
Paris and Antheus
Polyphemus and Silenus
Poseidon and Nerites
Poseidon and Pelops
Polyeidos and Glaucus
Rhadamanthus and Talos
Sarpedon and Miletus
Silvanus and Cyparissus
Thamyris and Hyacinth
Theseus and Pirithous
Zephyrus and Cyparissus
Zephyrus and Hyacinth
Zeus (Artemis) and Callisto
Zeus and Ganymede

Sex and gender

Transgender
The sex-change theme also occurred in classical mythology. The reason for the transformation varies, as in the case of Siproites (Σιπροίτης), a hunter from Crete, who was transformed to a woman by Artemis after having seen the goddess bathing/nude.

There was also a motif of a woman needing to disguise herself as a male and later being transformed into a biological male by mysterious forces (mainly the gods). In the cases of Iphis and Leucippus, the woman's mother was pressured (by her husband) to bear a male child so the protagonist was forced to  impersonate a male from birth. Later in life, manhood was granted through the blessing of a deity (Juno/Hera in Iphis' case and Leto in Leucippus').

Caeneus and Mestra, each of who was a mate of a god (Caeneus was a rape victim of Poseidon/Neptune and Mestra was a lover of the same god), were granted manhood by the said god. Mestra, however, had the ability to change her shape voluntarily, instead of staying in male form like Caeneus and other instances above.

Tiresias, on the other hand, became female because he struck a couple of copulating snakes, displeasing Hera, who punished him by transforming Tiresias into a woman. Later the sentence was remitted, due to either trampling on the mating snakes or avoiding them, and he became male again. In another version, Tiresias' sex-change was caused by an argument between Zeus and Hera, on which they debated whether a male or a female had greater pleasure in sex, so they transformed him into a female to experiment.

 Caeneus
 Iphis
 Leucippus
 Mestra
 Siproites
 Tiresias

Androgynes and intersex
According to Leah DeVun, a "traditional Hippocratic / Galenic model of sexual difference – popularized by the late antique physician Galen and the ascendant theory for much of the Middle Ages – viewed sex as a spectrum that encompassed masculine men, feminine women, and many shades in between, including hermaphrodites, a perfect balance of male and female". DeVun contrasts this with an Artistotelian view of intersex, which argued that "hermaphrodites were not an intermediate sex but a case of doubled or superfluous genitals", and this later influenced Aquinas.

Hermaphroditus (also the namesake of the word hermaphrodite), the son of Hermes and Aphrodite, is considered the god of hermaphrodites and intersex people. Hermaphroditus was depicted as a winged youth with both male and female features, that is, usually female thighs, breasts, and style of hair, and male genitalia.

Dionysus has been dubbed "a patron god of hermaphrodites and transvestites" by Roberto C. Ferrari in the 2002 Encyclopedia of Gay, Lesbian, Bisexual, Transgender, and Queer Culture. He is referred to as effeminate, which is sometimes linked to his being dressed in girl's clothes during his childhood. In Orphic Hymn 41, the goddess Mise is referred to as an aspect of Dionysus, who is described as "male and female" (ἄρσενα καὶ θῆλυν). 

Apollo was another god with effeminate features. His cheeks and chin are said to be soft and tender.<ref>Lucian, Dialogues of the gods</ref> He was beardless and kept his hair long, giving him a feminine appearance. In one of his myths, he is mocked for draping himself in women's clothing, while his twin sister Artemis was made fun of for appearing manly and rough.

In addition to Dionysus/Mise, several gods are referred to as "both male and female" or "both female and male" in the Orphic Hymns, including Selene, Athena, and Adonis. In Cyprus and Athens, an aspect of Aphrodite with male genitals and in some cases a beard, called Aphroditos, was worshipped. Macrobius (c. 400s AD) wrote in his Saturnalia'', at 3.8.2:
There's also a statue of Venus on Cyprus, that's bearded, shaped and dressed like a woman, with scepter and male genitals, and they conceive her as both male and female. Aristophanes calls her Aphroditus, and Laevius says: Worshiping, then, the nurturing god Venus, whether she is male or female, just as the Moon is a nurturing goddess. In his Atthis Philochorus, too, states that she is the Moon and that men sacrifice to her in women's dress, women in men's, because she is held to be both male and female.

Agdistis (Cybele)
Aphroditus
The Enarees
Hermaphroditus
The Machlyes
Phanes
Salmacis
The Scythians
Venus Barbata
Venus Castina

See also

 LGBT themes in mythology
 LGBT themes in speculative fiction
 LGBT literature
 LGBT history
 Homosexuality in ancient Greece
 Homosexuality in ancient Rome
 Religion and homosexuality
 Transgender people and religion

References

Bibliography
 

 

Classical mythology